Daniela Caracas González (born 25 April 1997) is a Colombian footballer who plays as a centre back for Spanish Primera Federación club RCD Espanyol and the Colombia women's national team.

International career
Caracas made her senior debut for Colombia during the 2018 Copa América Femenina.

References

External links
Daniela Caracas at BDFútbol

1997 births
Living people
Women's association football central defenders
Colombian women's footballers
Footballers from Cali
Colombia women's international footballers
Pan American Games gold medalists for Colombia
Pan American Games medalists in football
Footballers at the 2019 Pan American Games
Primera División (women) players
EdF Logroño players
Colombian expatriate women's footballers
Colombian expatriate sportspeople in Spain
Expatriate women's footballers in Spain
Medalists at the 2019 Pan American Games
RCD Espanyol Femenino players
Primera Federación (women) players
21st-century Colombian women